Pseudocalotes tympanistriga, the Indonesian false bloodsucker, is a species of agamid lizard. It is found in Indonesia.

References

Pseudocalotes
Reptiles of Indonesia
Reptiles described in 1831
Taxa named by John Edward Gray